Season eight of Dancing with the Stars premiered on Monday, March 9, 2009, on the ABC network.

The show generally followed the format of previous seasons, with thirteen couples, although there were some changes, including two new dances, the Argentine tango and Lindy Hop, and an occasional dance-off between the bottom two couples, in order to determine who would be eliminated.

Olympic gymnast Shawn Johnson and Mark Ballas were crowned the champions, while Gilles Marini and Cheryl Burke finished in second place, and Melissa Rycroft and Tony Dovolani finished third.

Cast

Couples
Originally, the season was advertised as the first American season where a husband and wife would compete against each other: rodeo champion Ty Murray and singer-songwriter Jewel. However, just prior to the series, Jewel fractured both of her tibias and was unable to compete. She was replaced by Holly Madison. Murray chose to continue on the show, while Jewel appeared during the season as a special musical guest. Nancy O'Dell, then co-host of Access Hollywood, was also originally announced to be on the show, but was forced to withdraw from the competition due to a torn meniscus, which required surgery. She was replaced by Melissa Rycroft, who had won season 13 of The Bachelor.

Future appearances
Shawn Johnson, Gilles Marini, and Melissa Rycroft later competed in the All-Stars season, where Johnson was paired with Derek Hough, Marini was paired with Peta Murgatroyd, and Rycroft remained with Tony Dovolani.

Host and judges
The show was again co-hosted by Tom Bergeron and Samantha Harris. Len Goodman, Bruno Tonioli and Carrie Ann Inaba returned as judges.

Scoring charts

Notes

 : This was the lowest score of the week.
 : This was the highest score of the week.
 :  This couple finished in first place.
 :  This couple finished in second place.
 :  This couple finished in third place.
 :  This couple was in the bottom two, but was not eliminated.
 :  This couple was eliminated.

Highest and lowest scoring performances 
The highest and lowest performances in each dance according to the judges' 30-point scale are as follows.

Couples' highest and lowest scoring dances
Scores are based upon a potential 30-point maximum.

Weekly scores
Individual judges scores in charts below (given in parentheses) are listed in this order from left to right: Carrie Ann Inaba, Len Goodman, Bruno Tonioli.

Week 1
Each couple performed either the cha-cha-cha or waltz. Couples are listed in the order they performed.

Week 2
Each couple performed either the quickstep or salsa. The two couples in the bottom two competed against each other in a dance-off to determine which would also be eliminated. Couples are listed in the order they performed.

Due to an injury, Steve-O was unable to dance on the live show, so his rehearsal footage was shown and scored instead.

Week 3
Each couple performed either the samba or foxtrot. The two couples in the bottom two competed against each other in a dance-off to determine which would also be eliminated. Couples are listed in the order they performed.

Week 4
Each couple performed either the Lindy Hop or Argentine tango. Two couples were eliminated at the end of the night. Couples are listed in the order they performed.

Week 5
Each couple performed either the Viennese waltz or paso doble. The two couples in the bottom two competed against each other in a dance-off to determine which would also be eliminated. Couples are listed in the order they performed.

Week 6
Each couple performed either the jive or rumba. Couples are listed in the order they performed.

Week 7
Each couple performed one unlearned dance, and they all participated in a group swing dance. Couples are listed in the order they performed.

Week 8
Each couple performed one unlearned dance, plus participated in a group dance. Couples are listed in the order they performed.

Due to an injury, Melissa Rycroft was unable to perform her jive or participate in the team dance on the live show. Lacey Schwimmer filled in for her on the team dance, while Rycroft's rehearsal footage for her jive was shown and scored instead.

Week 9
Each couple performed two unlearned dances. Couples are listed in the order they performed.

Week 10
Each couple performed two unlearned dances. Couples are listed in the order they performed.

Week 11: Finals
On the first night, each couple competed in a group paso doble, where they each received their own set of scores, and then performed their freestyle routines. On the second night, each couple performed their favorite dance of the season. Couples are listed in the order they performed.

Night 1

 Night 2

Dance chart
The celebrities and professional partners danced one of these routines for each corresponding week.
 Week 1: One unlearned dance (cha-cha-cha or waltz)
 Week 2: One unlearned dance (quickstep or salsa)
 Week 3: One unlearned dance (foxtrot or samba)
 Week 4: One unlearned dance (Argentine tango or Lindy Hop)
 Week 5: One unlearned dance (paso doble or Viennese waltz)
 Week 6: One unlearned dance (jive or rumba)
 Week 7: One unlearned dance & swing group dance
 Week 8: One unlearned dance & team dances
 Week 9: Two unlearned dances
 Week 10: Two unlearned dances
 Week 11 (Night 1): Paso doble face-off & freestyle
 Week 11 (Night 2): Favorite dance of the season

Notes

 :  This was the highest scoring dance of the week.
 :  This was the lowest scoring dance of the week.
 :  This couple danced, but received no scores.

References

External links

Dancing with the Stars (American TV series)
2009 American television seasons